The Thomas P. Ives House is a National Historic Landmark at 66 Power Street in the College Hill in Providence, Rhode Island. Built in 1803–06, this brick house is an extremely well-preserved and little-altered example of Adamesque-Federal style. The house was built by Caleb Ormsbee, a Providence master builder, for Thomas Poynton Ives, a wealthy merchant. Although two of its principal chambers were redecorated in the 1870s, these alterations were reversed in the 1950s. The house was in Ives family hands for more than 150 years. It was designated a National Historic Landmark on December 30, 1970.

Description
The Ives House is a -story brick structure, with a hip roof surrounded by a low balustrade. The front facade and sides are laid in Flemish bond, while the back wall is laid in American bond. The front is five bays wide, with a single-story circular porch (an 1884 addition) sheltering the centered entry. The doorway is flanked by sidelight windows and topped by an elliptical fanlight. On the right side of the house is a projecting bay, which originally was a single story but now rises the full three stories. The main roof cornice is modillioned.

The first floor of the interior is a grand and imposing presence. The central hallway is ten feet wide, with rooms on either side and a stairway that spirals upward. The main parlor is to the right, with an oval library in the center, and a smoking room at the back. On the left is the dining room, with a pantry and kitchen behind. The public rooms are decorated in delicate Adamesque woodwork, with the parlor and dining room also featuring particularly elaborate plaster decoration.

History

Thomas Poynton Ives (1759–1835) was a wealthy merchant, who received his training in the counting house of Nicholas Brown, Sr., married Brown's daughter Hope, and in 1796 former the partnership of Brown & Ives with Nicholas Brown, Jr., for whom Brown University is named. Ives hired Caleb Ormsbee to build this house, which was built between 1803 and 1806. The house remained in the hands of the Ives family until 1910. At that time it was sold to Brown University, retaining a lifetime occupancy right for owners.

The house underwent a number of relatively modest alterations. Gas lighting and central heat were added in 1848, and French doors were added to the library in 1910. The most significant ones occurred in the 1870s, when the dining room and library were redecorated in the Colonial Revival style. This work was removed in 1954, replaced by Federal styling more in keeping with the rest of the house. A period fireplace mantel from Philadelphia was installed in the dining room as part of this work.

The house was designated a National Historic Landmark and listed on the National Register of Historic Places in 1970; it was included as a contributing property to the expansive College Hill Historic District, a National Historic Landmark District encompassing the original colonial center of Providence.

Gallery

See also

 List of National Historic Landmarks in Rhode Island
 National Register of Historic Places listings in Providence, Rhode Island

References

External links
 
 

National Historic Landmarks in Rhode Island
Houses on the National Register of Historic Places in Rhode Island
Houses completed in 1806
Houses in Providence, Rhode Island
Historic American Buildings Survey in Rhode Island
National Register of Historic Places in Providence, Rhode Island
Historic district contributing properties in Rhode Island